Nowhere Boys is a 5-piece pop rock band in Hong Kong formed in 2015. It is currently under record label Media Asia. Band members include vocalist/guitarist Van Chan, drummer Nate Wong, guitarist Kenneth Angus, keyboardist/ violinist Fisher Kan, and bassist Hansun Chan. Nowhere Boys classified their music as ‘Cinematic Rock’, most of their songs are inspired by movies.

Background
Members of Nowhere Boys are of different background. Before Nowhere Boys, Van was an architect; Nate, graduated from Berklee College of Music, was a full-time drummer. Kenneth was a guitar fixer, Fisher and Hansun taught piano/guitar.

In October 2014, Van met drummer Nate at a movie music event in Backstage Live Restaurant in Hong Kong. After jamming, they decided to form a band. Van thus found Kenneth, Fisher and Hansun whom he met earlier to form the band.

Career
In July 2015, they released their first self-financed Extended Play, Nowhere Boys. The EP was recorded in their homes with their own equipment. The 1,000 copies printed were gone in three months. It also went top 10 in iTunes Music. They signed with Frenzi Music in late 2015.

Nowhere Boys then successfully crowdfunded HKD$100,000 (~ US$12,800) via Musicbee for their second EP, Welcome To Our Hyperreality, which was released in April 2016.

Nowhere Boys recorded “普通華” with actor Neo Yau Hawk-Sau in August 2016. The song went number 7 in Hong Kong Commercial Radio charts. They also created the theme song, Song of Battle, for E-Sports Festival 2016.

Name
The name of the band was from the British film Nowhere Boy (2009). In a scene, young John Lennon gets told off at school. “You’re going nowhere!” snarls a furious headmaster. The future Beatles founder replies: “Is ‘nowhere’ full of geniuses, sir? Because I probably do belong there.”

Discography

Song Chart

References

Musical groups established in 2015
Hong Kong rock musicians
2015 establishments in Hong Kong